Marcel Ponseele (Kortrijk, 1957) is a Belgian oboist.

Ponseele studied at Bruges and other conservatories in Belgium. He has specialised in the baroque oboe and is involved in making his own instruments in 18th-century style. He is known for his performances of Bach.

Discography
He has made a number of recordings as a soloist, playing baroque oboe and related instruments such as the oboe d'amore. 
His Bach recordings include oboe solos in sets of cantatas conducted by John Eliot Gardiner, Ton Koopman and others.

See also
 il Gardellino

References

1957 births
Living people
Baroque oboists
Belgian performers of early music
Male oboists
Academic staff of the Conservatoire de Paris